The Bourbon Stakes is a Grade II American thoroughbred horse race for two-year-olds over a distance of  miles on the turf held annually in early October at Keeneland Race Course in Lexington, Kentucky during the fall meeting.

History
The event was inaugurated on 23 October 1991 as the Hopemont Stakes and was won by the short priced 1-2 favorite Stress Buster who was ridden by US Hall of Fame jockey Pat Day in a time of 1:44.84. The name of the event was in honor of the Hunt–Morgan House, historically known as Hopemont located in Lexington.

The event was run in two divisions in 1998.

In 2003 the event was renamed to the Bourbon County Stakes – Bourbon County is near Lexington and is home to many famous Throroughbred farms. 

From 2005 to 2008, the event was run as the Bourbon Stakes, with sponsorship from Woodford Reserve which reflected in the name of the race. Since 2014, the race has been sponsored by Dixiana Farm.

In 2006, 2013 and 2017, the race was switched from turf to the main track due to weather conditions. 

In 2008 the event was classified as Grade III and in 2020 was upgraded to Grade II.
The race is part of the Breeders' Cup Challenge series. The winner of the Bourbon Stakes receives a "Win and You're In" berth in the Breeders' Cup Juvenile Turf.

Records
Speed record: 
 1:42.42 – Gateman (1999)

Margins
 lengths – Stage Call (IRE) (2001)

Most wins by an owner
 3 – John C. Oxley (2000, 2015, 2017)

Most wins by a jockey
 4 – Julien Leparoux (2010, 2012, 2015, 2017)

Most wins by a trainer
 5 – Todd A. Pletcher (2006, 2008, 2009, 2018, 2020)

Winners

Legend:

See also 
 List of American and Canadian Graded races

References

Keeneland horse races
Flat horse races for two-year-olds
Turf races in the United States
Graded stakes races in the United States
Grade 2 stakes races in the United States
Recurring events established in 1991
Breeders' Cup Challenge series
1991 establishments in Kentucky